Nathaniel Grace Lambert  (1811 – 9 December 1882) was an English mine-owner and Liberal Party politician who sat in the House of Commons from 1868 to 1880.

Lambert was the son of Richard Lambert of Newcastle upon Tyne and his wife Achsah Grace, daughter of Nathaniel Grace. He was educated privately and became a mine-owner. He was a captain on the Taplow Yeomanry Lancers and a J.P. and deputy lieutenant for Buckinghamshire. In 1865 he was High Sheriff of Buckinghamshire.

At the 1868 general election Lambert was elected as a Member of Parliament (MP) for Buckinghamshire. He held the seat until 1880.

Lambert died at the age of 71.

Lambert married Mary Ann Richards, daughter of Thomas Wright Richards of Rushden, Northamptonshire, in 1843.

Their youngest daughter, Christina, married Lord John Hay in 1876.

References

External links
 

1811 births
1882 deaths
Liberal Party (UK) MPs for English constituencies
UK MPs 1868–1874
UK MPs 1874–1880
High Sheriffs of Buckinghamshire
Deputy Lieutenants of Buckinghamshire
English justices of the peace
British Yeomanry officers